Lucas Esteban Ceballos (born 3 January 1987) is an Argentine professional footballer who plays as a defender for Mitre.

Career
Ceballos' career began in 2007 with Torneo Argentino A club Sportivo Desamparados. He remained with the club for three years and subsequently made one hundred and two appearances and scored five goals. In June 2010, Ceballos departed to sign for Argentine Primera División side Godoy Cruz. He made six appearances in his debut season for Godoy, prior to making one hundred and seventeen more appearances in his next six campaigns with them. In his ninety-fifth league game for Godoy he scored his first goal, scoring the third in a 3–0 win against Crucero del Norte.

On 29 June 2016, Ceballos joined fellow Primera División side Colón. His first game for Colón came a month later in a league match versus Aldosivi. Patronato signed Ceballos in June 2018.

Career statistics

References

External links
 

1987 births
Living people
People from San Juan, Argentina
Argentine footballers
Association football defenders
Torneo Argentino A players
Argentine Primera División players
Sportivo Desamparados footballers
Godoy Cruz Antonio Tomba footballers
Club Atlético Colón footballers
Club Atlético Patronato footballers
Club Atlético Mitre footballers
Sportspeople from San Juan Province, Argentina